Nery Alejandro Fernández Alcaraz (born 21 February 1981) is a Paraguayan former professional footballer who played as a forward.

References
 
 

1981 births
Living people
Association football forwards
Paraguayan footballers
Paraguayan expatriate footballers
Sportivo Luqueño players
Club Deportivo Palestino footballers
Provincial Osorno footballers
Club Aurora players
Club Real Potosí players
Deportivo Zacapa players
Deportes Copiapó footballers
Universitario de Sucre footballers
Expatriate footballers in Chile
Expatriate footballers in Bolivia
Expatriate footballers in Guatemala